Thales Alford McReynolds (June 8, 1943 – July 3, 1988) was an American professional basketball player. He played in the National Basketball Association (NBA) for the Baltimore Bullets after he was selected as the 82nd pick of the 1965 NBA draft. McReynolds played five games for the Bullets during the 1965–66 NBA season and averaged .6 points per game, 1.2 rebounds per game and .2 assists per game.

References

External links
 

1943 births
1988 deaths
American men's basketball players
Baltimore Bullets (1963–1973) draft picks
Baltimore Bullets (1963–1973) players
Basketball players from Birmingham, Alabama
College men's basketball players in the United States
Guards (basketball)
Miles College alumni